Bartonella is a genus of Gram-negative bacteria. It is the only genus in the family Bartonellaceae. Facultative intracellular parasites, Bartonella species can infect healthy people, but are considered especially important as opportunistic pathogens. Bartonella species are transmitted by vectors such as ticks, fleas, sand flies, and mosquitoes. At least eight Bartonella species or subspecies are known to infect humans.

Bartonella henselae is the organism responsible for cat scratch disease.

History
Bartonella species have been infecting humans for thousands of years, as demonstrated by Bartonella quintana DNA in a 4000-year-old tooth. The genus is named for Alberto Leonardo Barton Thompson (1871–October 26, 1950), a Peruvian scientist.

Infection cycle
The currently accepted model explaining the infection cycle holds that the transmitting vectors are blood-sucking arthropods and the reservoir hosts are mammals. Immediately after infection, the bacteria colonize a primary niche, the endothelial cells. Every five days, some of the Bartonella bacteria in the endothelial cells are released into the blood stream, where they infect erythrocytes. The bacteria then invade a phagosomal membrane inside the erythrocytes, where they multiply until they reach a critical population density. At this point, they simply wait until they are taken up with the erythrocytes by a blood-sucking arthropod.

Though some studies have found "no definitive evidence of transmission by a tick to a vertebrate host,"  Bartonella species are well-known to be transmissible to both animals and humans through various other vectors, such as fleas, lice, and sand flies. Recent studies have shown a strong correlation between tick exposure and bartonellosis, including human bartonellosis. Bartonella bacteria are associated with cat-scratch disease, but a study in 2010 concluded, "Clinicians should be aware that . . . a history of an animal scratch or bite is not necessary for disease transmission." All current Bartonella species identified in canines are human pathogens.

Pathophysiology
Bartonella infections are remarkable in the wide range of symptoms they can produce.  The course of the diseases (acute or chronic) and the underlying pathologies are highly variable.

Treatment
Treatment is dependent on which species or strain of Bartonella is found in a given patient. While Bartonella species are susceptible to a number of standard antibiotics in vitro—macrolides and tetracycline, for example—the efficacy of antibiotic treatment in immunocompetent individuals is uncertain. Immunocompromised patients should be treated with antibiotics because they are particularly susceptible to systemic disease and bacteremia. Drugs of particular effectiveness include trimethoprim-sulfamethoxazole, gentamicin, ciprofloxacin, and rifampin; B. henselae is generally resistant to penicillin, amoxicillin, and nafcillin.

Epidemiology
Homeless intravenous drug users are at high risk for Bartonella infections, particularly B. elizabethae. B. elizabethae seropositivity rates in this population range from 12.5% in Los Angeles, to 33% in Baltimore, Maryland, 46% in New York City, and 39% in Sweden.

Phylogeny
The currently accepted taxonomy is based on the List of Prokaryotic names with Standing in Nomenclature (LPSN). The phylogeny is based on whole-genome analysis.

References

External links
 August 30. 2014. People's Pharmacy Radio Podcast: Bartonella, website
 May 18, 2012 Bartonella spp. bacteremia and rheumatic symptoms in patients from Lyme disease-endemic region Medical publication, North Carolina State University, Raleigh, North Carolina, USA.
 Bartonella genomes and related information at PATRIC, a Bioinformatics Resource Center funded by NIAID
 New Bartonella Species That Infects Humans Discovered

Bartonellaceae
Bacteria genera
Tropical diseases